Lim Seung-gyeom is a South Korean football player who plays for Gimcheon Sangmu FC.

Career
Lim Seung-gyeom joined J2 League club Nagoya Grampus in 2017.

On 12 July 2018, Lim signed for Mokpo City after cutting short his loan deal at Oita Trinita.

References

External links

1995 births
Living people
South Korean footballers
South Korean expatriate footballers
South Korean expatriate sportspeople in Japan
J2 League players
Nagoya Grampus players
Oita Trinita players
Seongnam FC players
K League 1 players
Korea National League players
Association football forwards
Expatriate footballers in Japan